Ivan Fredericks (1864–1904), known as Russian Jack (Русский Джек),  was a goldminer of the Western Australian gold rush in the 1880s. In 1885, while working in the Halls Creek goldmines, he pushed his sick friend in a wheelbarrow 300 km through the Great Sandy Desert to Wyndham, the nearest town with a medical centre. A statue was erected to him in Halls Creek. He is buried in Fremantle Cemetery. While he may not be very well known in Russia, Russian Jack is a famous figure in Western Australia.

The Peter J. Bridge work Russian Jack claims the actual distance travelled to the nearest medical centre was not 300 km but actually closer to 50 km.

Notes

Burials at Fremantle Cemetery
Australian gold prospectors
Australian people of Finnish descent
Australian people of Russian descent
People from Halls Creek, Western Australia
Russian people of Finnish descent
1864 births
1904 deaths